The Muntinlupa-Parañaque-Las Piñas Football Association, also known as the MPLFA, is a Filipino football association based in Metro Manila. It works as the football association for the Muntinlupa-Parañaque-Las Piñas area and organizes local tournaments, such as the MPLFA Premier League. It is not yet a regular member of the Philippine Football Federation.

2005 establishments in the Philippines
Football governing bodies in the Philippines
Sports organizations established in 2005
Sports in Metro Manila